= Kundha Hosahatty =

Kundha Hosahutty is a small village which is 30 km far from Ooty, Tamil Nadu, India. It has known to be Kundha Hosahutty because the area around is known as Kundha Semay. Badaga is a southern Dravidian language (Old Kannada language branch) spoken by approximately 400,000 people in the Nilgiri Hills of Tamil Nadu. It is known for its retroflex vowels. It has similarities with neighbouring Kannada language and is considered a dialect of Kannada and now claimed as an independent language by a French linguistic scholar, Christiane Pilot-Raichoor. The word Badaga refers to the Badaga language as well as the Badaga indigenous people who speak it.
